Ukiah (Pomo: Yokaya, meaning "deep valley") is the county seat and largest city of Mendocino County, California, with a population of 16,607 at the 2020 census. With its accessible location along the U.S. Route 101 corridor, Ukiah serves as the city center for Mendocino County and much of neighboring Lake County.

History

Establishment

Ukiah is located within Rancho Yokaya, one of several Spanish colonial land grants in what their colonists called Alta California. The Yokaya grant, which covered the majority of the Ukiah valley, was named for the Pomo word meaning "deep valley." The Pomo are the indigenous people who occupied the area at the time of Spanish colonization.

Later European-American settlers adopted "Ukiah" as an anglicized version of this name for the city.

Cayetano Juárez was granted Ukiah by Alta California. He was known to have a neutral relationship with the local Pomo people. He sold a southern portion of the grant (toward present-day Hopland) to the Burke brothers. The first Anglo settler in the Ukiah area was John Parker, a vaquero who worked for pioneer cattleman James Black. Black had driven his stock up the Russian River valley and took over a block of grazing land at that locale. A crude blockhouse was constructed for Parker so he could have shelter to protect the herd from the hostile indigenous local people, who resented the squatters on their land. The blockhouse was located just south of present-day Ukiah on the banks of what was known as Wilson Creek.

The next Anglo settler was Samuel Lowry; in 1856 he built a log cabin approximately on the corner of today's East Perkins and North Main streets. Lowery sold his claim to A.T. Perkins in the spring of 1857, and the latter moved his family into the valley. They were the first Anglo-American pioneer family of the township. Six others followed to make their home there that same year. The first United States post office opened in 1858. By 1859, the population of Ukiah had grown to about 100 people, making it a community sufficient in size to serve as the county seat. Before this, administrative duties for Mendocino County had been handled by Sonoma County.

Initially visitors could reach town only by stagecoach, or private horses. In 1870 the remainder of the trip to Ukiah took another two days by horse. In subsequent years the rail line was extended further northward to Cloverdale.

Ukiah was incorporated in 1876. It was not until 1889 that the San Francisco and North Pacific Railroad completed its line from Cloverdale to Ukiah, linking the Mendocino County seat to the national rail network.

Economic history
Ukiah has been the hub of an agricultural and business community. Over the decades various commodity crops have been grown in the Ukiah Valley. They include pears, green beans, hops, apricots, and grapes. As part of California's Wine Country, grapes have become the predominant agricultural product.

Hops were once a major crop grown around Ukiah. The beer flavoring agent was first grown there in 1868 when L.F. Long of Largo grew an initial experimental crop. The climate proved suitable for the crop and production expanded, peaking in 1885. It declined in the last years of the 1880s as prices dropped. Mendocino County remained the third-largest producer of hops in the state of California in 1890, with well over  under cultivation. Production continued well into the 20th century. A refurbished hop kiln can be seen at the north end of Ukiah east of Highway 101, where many of the old fields were located.

Ukiah's 20th-century population developed in relation to the lumber boom of the late 1940s. Logging of redwoods was once a major industry. Activists have worked to preserve areas of redwood forest, which became endangered due to overlogging.  Young people entered the area from the 1960s, seeking alternative lifestyles and, in some cases, artisan and rural living.

Geography
Ukiah is in southeastern Mendocino County in the valley of the Russian River, a south-flowing river which reaches the Pacific in Sonoma County.

Climate
Ukiah has a hot-summer Mediterranean climate (Köppen: Csa). Measurable precipitation occurs on an average of 77.1 days per year. Light snowfall occurs about every other year. Due to frequent low humidity, summer temperatures normally drop into the fifties at night. Freezing temperatures occur on an average 33.6 mornings per year.

Demographics

2010
The 2010 United States Census reported that Ukiah had a population of 16,075. The racial makeup of Ukiah was 11,592 (72.1%) White, 174 (1.1%) African American, 601 (3.7%) Native American, 412 (2.6%) Asian, 34 (0.2%) Pacific Islander, 2,385 (14.8%) from other races, and 877 (5.5%) from two or more races. There were 4,458 Hispanic or Latino residents, of any race (27.7%).

The Census reported that 15,301 people (95.2% of the population) lived in households, 281 (1.7%) lived in non-institutionalized group quarters, and 493 (3.1%) were institutionalized.

There were 6,158 households, out of which 2,049 (33.3%) had children under the age of 18 living in them, 2,317 (37.6%) were opposite-sex married couples living together, 938 (15.2%) had a female householder with no husband present, 356 (5.8%) had a male householder with no wife present. There were 484 (7.9%) unmarried opposite-sex partnerships, and 56 (0.9%) same-sex married couples or partnerships. 2,064 households (33.5%) were made up of individuals, and 919 (14.9%) had someone living alone who was 65 years of age or older. The average household size was 2.48. There were 3,611 families (58.6% of all households); the average family size was 3.18.

The population was spread out in age, with 3,981 people (24.8%) under the age of 18, 1,562 people (9.7%) aged 18 to 24, 4,184 people (26.0%) aged 25 to 44, 4,011 people (25.0%) aged 45 to 64, and 2,337 people (14.5%) who were 65 years of age or older. The median age was 35.9 years. For every 100 females, there were 92.8 males. For every 100 females age 18 and over, there were 89.3 males.

The homeowner vacancy rate was 2.6%; the rental vacancy rate was 3.7%. 6,733 people (41.9% of the population) lived in owner-occupied housing units and 8,568 people (53.3%) lived in rental housing units.

2000

As of the census of 2000, inside the city limits, there were 15,497 people, 5,985 households, and 3,656 families residing in the city. The population density was 3,275/sq mi (1,265/km). The racial makeup of the city was 79.5% White, 1.0% African American, 3.8% Native American, 1.7% Asian, 0.1% Pacific Islander, 9.7% from other races, and 4.3% from two or more races. Hispanic or Latino of any race were 19.3% of the population.

There were 5,985 households, out of which 33.0% had children under the age of 18 living with them, 40.2% were married couples living together, 15.8% had a female householder with no husband present, and 38.9% were non-families. 32.2% of all households were made up of individuals, and 14.5% had someone living alone who was 65 years of age or older. The average household size was 2.47 and the average family size was 3.12.

In the city, the population was spread out in age, with 26.5% under the age of 18, 9.6% from 18 to 24, 28.1% from 25 to 44, 21.6% from 45 to 64, and 14.3% who were 65 years of age or older. The median age was 35 years. For every 100 females, there were 91.8 males. For every 100 females age 18 and over, there were 88.1 males.

The median income for a household in the city was $32,707, and the median income for a family was $39,524. Males had a median income of $31,608 versus $24,673 for females. The per capita income for the city was $17,601. About 13.2% of families and 18.1% of the population were below the poverty line, including 26.4% of those under age 18 and 7.8% of those age 65 or over.

As a community, Ukiah has roughly twice the number of people (including Redwood Valley, Potter Valley, Calpella, and Talmage) as the census reports. During the business day, an average of 40,000 people work inside the city limits, or in the business and residential neighborhoods to the north and south.

Economy
Major employers in Ukiah include:
 Mendocino County
 Ukiah Valley Medical Center
 Mendocino Forest Products
 Walmart
 Savings Bank of Mendocino County
 Mendocino Community Health Clinics
 Granite Construction
 The Home Depot
 Lucky

Major products 

Ukiah is known for wine production. Some very large production wineries, including Brutocao, Fife, Parducci, Frey, and Bonterra have become established here since the late 20th century. Ukiah vintners are known for innovating with organic and sustainable practices.

Ukiah was previously a major producer of pears. Alex R. Thomas & Company owned hundreds of acres of Bartlett pear orchards on the east side of the Ukiah Valley. For nearly 90 years, many local residents and migrant workers have been employed packing the pears for domestic and foreign consumption. On December 1, 2008, the company announced it would be shutting down major operations at the end of the year due to bankruptcy. Several acres of orchard have been torn down and replaced with vineyards since the packing shed closed its doors. As of 2011, the main facility was slated to reopen as a composting and trash-sorting facility.

The Ukiah Valley is home to the Ukiah Brewing Company, a certified organic brewpub. Ukiah used to be a center of hops cultivation in the 19th century. Craft beers are stimulating production again.

Additionally, Ukiah has become home to four marijuana dispensaries, as a large town within the Emerald Triangle. Cannabis is produced and sold from the surrounding areas.

Arts and culture

Institutions of the arts include:
 SPACE - School of Performing Arts and Cultural Education
 Ukiah Players Theatre
 The Mendocino Ballet
 Ukiah Civic Light Opera
 Grace Hudson Museum
 Ukiah Symphony Orchestra
 Ukiah Community Concert Association
 The Spring House

Recreation
 Alex R. Thomas Plaza
 Gardner Park
 Giorno Park
 Great Redwood Trail
 Low Gap Park
 McGarvey Park
 Oak Manor Park
 Observatory Park
 Orchard Park
 Riverside Park
 Todd Grove Park
 Ukiah Skate Park
 Ukiah Sports Complex
 Vinewood Park

Government
Ukiah uses a council–manager form of government in which policy is set by a five-member city council, elected at-large to four-year terms.  The council appoints both the mayor and the city manager.

 Mayor until December 2023 - Mari Rodin  (appointed by council based on seniority for a one-year term)
 City council:
 Josefina Dueñas, Vice-Mayor
 Douglas Crane, Council Member
 Juan Orozco, Council Member
 Susan Sher, Council Member
 City Manager - Sage Sangiacomo
 City Treasurer - Allen Carter
 City Clerk - Kristine Lawler (appointed)
 City Attorney - David Rapport

The tribal headquarters of both the Pinoleville Pomo Nation and the Potter Valley Tribe are in Ukiah.

Education

Ukiah Unified School District
 Ukiah High School
 Calpella Elementary School
 Eagle Peak Middle School (Redwood Valley)
 Nokomis Elementary School
 Oak Manor Elementary School
 Pomolita Middle School
 South Valley High School
 Yokayo Elementary School
 Frank Zeek Elementary School
 Tree of Life Montessori Charter School
 Grace Hudson Elementary School
 River Oak Charter School
 Ukiah Independent Study Academy
 Calpella Preschool
 Preschool Village
 Small Wonders State Preschool
 Yokayo State Preschool
 Ukiah Adult School

Other K–12 schools
 Accelerated Achievement Academy
 Redwood Academy of Ukiah
 Deep Valley Christian School
 Ukiah Junior Academy
 Instilling Goodness / Developing Virtue School
 St. Mary of the Angels Catholic School

Former K–12 schools 
 Trinity School for Children (closed as of July 31, 2009)

Colleges
 Mendocino College
 Dharma Realm Buddhist University

Notable people
 AFI lead vocalist Davey Havok, guitarist Jade Puget, drummer Adam Carson, and tour managers Jake MacLachlan and Smith Puget were all raised in Ukiah, as were original-lineup guitarist Mark Stopholese and bassist Vic Chalker.
Phoebe Bridgers, three-time Grammy-nominated singer, spent part of her childhood in Ukiah.
 Ed Burke, U.S. Olympic hammer thrower
 Aurelius O. Carpenter, photographer
 Melissa Chaty, beauty queen, Miss California in 2008
 McKenna Faith, singer-songwriter
 Shiloh Fernandez, actor, born and raised in Ukiah
 Robben Ford, blues guitarist, raised in Ukiah
 Casey Frey, social media comedian and dancer, born and raised in Ukiah
Sally Miller Gearhart, feminist and lesbian author and activist, died in Ukiah
 Grace Hudson, museum founder, collector of Pomo artifacts, commercial portrait photographer The Grace Hudson Museum in Ukiah is named for her and houses her collections.
 Leonard Lake, serial killer, lived near Ukiah in the early 1980s
 Mary McNair Mathews, (1834–1903), Nevada historian, died in Ukiah 
 Darrell McClure, cartoonist of Little Annie Rooney and illustrator, born in Ukiah to painter Ethel Jameson Docker
 Don Mossi, Major League Baseball pitcher for several teams
 Holly Near, singer-songwriter, born in Ukiah
 Nick 13, lead singer of Tiger Army, raised in Ukiah
 Hal Perry, professional basketball player and civil-rights lawyer, raised in Ukiah
 Bay Raitt, animator and video game designer known for developing Gollum's facial modeling in the Lord of the Rings films and various other works
 Aaron Rodgers, National Football League quarterback, spent four years of his childhood in Ukiah
 Carl Sassenrath, architect of operating systems and computer languages, created the Amiga computer operating system in 1985, later worked at Apple, subsequently moved to and runs his own company at his Ukiah ranch
 William Harrison Standley, Chief of Naval Operations and later U.S. Ambassador to the Soviet Union, born in Ukiah
 Gary Scott Thompson, television and film screenwriter and producer, graduated from Ukiah High School in 1977
 Rick Warren, pastor, author and Ukiah High School graduate

In popular culture

 "Ukiah" is the name and subject of a song on the 1973 Doobie Brothers album The Captain and Me.
 "Ukiah" is the name and subject of the fifth song from Robert Francis' album Heaven.
 Ukiah is featured prominently in C.D. Payne's novel Youth in Revolt.
 Ukiah is one of six original locations of an International Latitude Observatory.
 Competing in the men's Division III club level bracket, the Mendocino Steam Donkeys Rugby Football Club rugby union team, based in the Ukiah area, are the first official NCRFU team in the county.
 Ukiah was the initial home in California of Peoples Temple.
 Ukiah's newspaper is the Ukiah Daily Journal.
 Ukiah was named in the 1987 Dragnet film as being where Frank Smith, Joe Friday's partner, moved to after quitting the force and buying a goat farm.

See also
 Pomo people
 First Baptist Church (Ukiah, California)

References

Further reading
 Aurelius O. Carpenter and Percy H. Millberry, History of Mendocino and Lake Counties, California: With Biographical Sketches of the Leading Men and Women of the Counties Who Have Been Identified with their Growth and Development from the Early Days to the Present. Los Angeles, CA: Historic Record Co., 1914.
 Lyman Palmer, History of Mendocino County, California, Comprising Its Geography, Geology, Topography, Climatography, Springs and Timber. San Francisco, CA: Alley, Bowen and Co., 1880.

External links

 

 
1876 establishments in California
Cities in Mendocino County, California
County seats in California
Incorporated cities and towns in California
Logging communities in the United States
Populated places established in 1856
Populated places established in 1876